The Bihar Legislative Council, (officially in Hindi, Bihar Vidhana Parishad) is the upper house of the bicameral legislature of Bihar state in eastern India.

Chronological list of members of Bihar Legislative Council 
This is a chronological list of current and past members of the Bihar Legislative Council by the date of appointment. The state elects members for a term of 6 years. 27 members are indirectly elected by the state legislators, 24 members are elected by Local Authorities, 6 from Graduates constituencies and 6 from teachers constituencies. The Governor of Bihar nominates up to 12 eminent people as members from various fields.

   represents current members

 MLA - elected by Members of Bihar Legislative Assembly
 LA - Local Authorities
 GR - Graduates
 TR - Teachers
 NOM - Nominated

References 

 
Lists of state legislators of Indian States
Legislative Council